Gay Courter  is an American author, filmmaker, and children's rights activist. Her first non-fiction work, The Beansprout Book (1973), introduced beansprouts to the supermarkets of America, and she eventually became known as "The Pied Piper of sprouting." Her works have been translated into several languages, including French, Spanish, and Swedish. Courter is credited with being one of the first Women Authors to write a published novel on a word processor.

Biography 
Courter was born in Pittsburgh, Pennsylvania to Leonard M. Weisman, an international businessman, and Elsie Spector Weisman, a social worker who studied at Carnegie Tech. She is the elder of two daughters. Her sister, Robin Madden, M.D., is a pediatrician. Her foster sister, Jennifer Chang Su, began living with the family while they were in Taiwan in 1952.

Courter attended schools in Taiwan, Japan and the United States, and was homeschooled by her mother during their travels. She graduated from AB Davis High School and received a B.A. in Drama/Film from Antioch College in 1966.   

From 1967 to 1970, she worked in the documentary and educational film business in New York with Harvest Productions, ACI Films, and Concord Productions and in 1972 co-founded Courter Films and Associates with husband Philip Courter producing more than 200 documentary, educational, and corporate films.  

Courter has been a vocal supporter of children's rights. She was a Guardian ad Litem in the Florida Courts for 25 years. Her non-fiction book, I Speak For This Child: True Stories of a Child Advocate led to many television appearances including the Today Show, Good Morning America, and 20/20.

Courter currently lives in Crystal River, Florida with her husband.  They are the parents of Blake Courter, an engineer; Joshua Courter, a filmmaker and furniture designer; and Ashley Rhodes-Courter, MSW, a motivational speaker and social worker.

Courter is also a travel writer for Creators Syndicate and other outlets. She is a member of the North American Travel Journalists Association, The Authors Guild, and Writers Guild of America.

Diamond Princess 
In February 2020, Courter was one of 3,700 passengers and crew quarantined on the Diamond Princess cruise ship, which was held in port at Yokohama, Japan during the coronavirus outbreak. In an interview with The New York Times, Courter questioned the efficacy of keeping passengers quarantined on board the ship, where the virus was rapidly spreading. The Atlantic published a piece by Courter, detailing her trip in Asia, her time on the Diamond Princess, and her experience in quarantine once back in the United States. Courter feared she and her husband would suffer from symptoms of PTSD, and those experiences later became the book, Quarantine! How I Survived the Diamond Princess Cornonavirus Crisis.

Literary styles and themes 
Courter has written novels in both the first person and third person narrative styles. Many of her stories are based in places where she lived, such as central Brazil and Israel; people she has known including her paternal grandmother, who was a Russian midwife; and Israeli spies, who were family friends. Her father was an arms merchant for Israel and purchased an aircraft carrier for their navy.

Film producer 
Together with her husband, Philip, Gay has produced more than 200 documentary and educational films for more than thirty years.

Their PBS productions include Freedom From Famine: The Norman Borlaug Story (Mathile/PBS 2009), Solutions Micro.doc series (WEDU/PBS, 1998), Where’s My Chance? The Case for America’s Children (WEDU/PBS, 1994), and The Florida Water Story (WEDU/PBS, 1988).

In 1995, Courter received special recognition from the Florida Chapter of American Women in Radio and Television, Inc. for her work on Where's My Chance? The Case for Our Children, which also won an Emmy award. Courter received her second Emmy from the National Academy of Arts and Television Sciences, Suncoast Chapter, for a series of public service announcements called Solutions for America’s Children.

Advocacy 

Since becoming a Guardian ad Litem in Florida, Gay Courter has been advocating for children on a local and national level. Her book, I Speak For This Child brought worldwide attention to the issues of children languishing in foster care. Courter, and her husband Philip, turned the focus of their film company into documenting the plight of foster children and produced over 75 films. They have received support for these projects from major foundations including the Pew Charitable Trust, David and Lucille Packard foundation, The Dave Thomas foundation for Adoption, and the American Humane Association.

Gay Courter has appeared as an advocate in the press, on national television, and at numerous conferences promoting Court-appointed Special Advocates (CASA), Guardians ad litem, foster and adoptive parenting. She widened her advocacy to litigate for policy and statute change and also to represent the victims of systemic abuse in personal injury and civil rights lawsuits.

Awards and honors 

 State of Florida Adoptive Parents of the Year, 2007.
 Altrusa International 10 Most Admired Women for Achievement in the Arts, 2007.
 U.S. Congressional Angel in Adoption, 2005.
 National Academy of Arts & Television Sciences Emmy (Solutions for America’s Children), 1998.
 Florida Center for Children & Youth Sharon Solomon Child Advocate Award, 1995.
 American Women in Radio & Television award (Where’s My Chance?),1995.
 National Academy of Arts & Television Sciences Emmy (Where’s My Chance?),1995.
 Altrusa International 10 Most Admired Women for Making a Difference, 1999.

Published works

Novels 

 (1981) The Midwife - Boston: Houghton Mifflin -  | OCLC 222278660
 (1984) River of Dreams - Boston: Houghton Mifflin -  | OCLC 990378800
 (1986) Code Ezra - Boston: Houghton Mifflin -  | OCLC  990267219
 (1990) Flowers in the Blood - New York -  | OCLC 55880474
 (1992) The Midwife's Advice - New York -  | OCLC 231690264
 (2013) Healing Paradise - Crystal River: Egret - ASIN# B00PKRLHC
 (2019) The Girl in the Box - Crystal River: Egret - ASIN# B07XY2M91W

Non-fiction 

(1973) The Beansprout Book - New York: Simon and Schuster -  | OCLC 948737482
(1995) I Speak for this Child: True Stories of a Child Advocate - New York: Crown -  | OCLC 48562295
(2003) How to Survive Your Husband's Midlife Crisis - New York: Penguin (co-written with Pat Gaudette)  | OCLC 747430402
(2020) Quarantine! How I Survived the Diamond Princess Cornonavirus Crisis-New York: Post Hill Press/Simon and Schuster -

References

Contemporary Authors Online, Gale, 2009. Reproduced in Biography Resource Center. Farmington Hills, Mich.: Gale, 2009. http://galenet.galegroup.com/servlet/BioRC
Periodical entries about Gay Courter from the Biography Reference Bank
Gay Courter at the Literature Resource Center

External links
Gay Courter
Courter Films and Associates
Books by Gay Courter at Library Thing
Extract from Quarantine! How I Survived the Diamond Princess Coronavirus Crisis at Asia Times

1944 births
20th-century American novelists
Screenwriters from Pennsylvania
Living people
Writers from Pittsburgh
21st-century American novelists
Antioch College alumni
American women novelists
20th-century American women writers
21st-century American women writers
Novelists from Pennsylvania
American women non-fiction writers
20th-century American non-fiction writers
21st-century American non-fiction writers